Sir Howard Hugh Panter is a British theatre impresario and theatre operator. With his wife Rosemary Squire he ran the Ambassador Theatre Group from about 1995 until 2016; they remain directors and shareholders of the company. When they left the active management of ATG, they bought Trafalgar Studios (the former Whitehall Theatre), which became the centre of a new company, Trafalgar Entertainment.

In a guide to "the 100 most influential people in UK theatre" published by The Stage, Panter and Squire were placed first  each year from 2010 to 2016. In 2013 they were placed first in the theatre section of the Evening Standard 'Power 1000'.

Panter received a knighthood in the 2013 Birthday Honours.

Career 

In 1991, with Sir Eddie Kulukundis and the brothers Peter and John Beckwith, Panter became a director of a company which bought the Duke of York's Theatre and in 1992 was renamed The Duke Of York's Theatre (Holdings) Limited. It later bought the Ambassadors Theatre, and was again renamed, to Ambassador Theatre Group.

In 2016 Panter and Squire ceased to manage the Ambassador Theatre Group. They bought Trafalgar Studios (the former Whitehall Theatre) from the group, and made it the centre of a new company, Trafalgar Entertainment.

Other roles 
Panter is on the development board of LAMDA, and was chairman of the Rambert Dance Company for ten years. In March 2020 he was appointed chair of The Birmingham Rep Theatre. He is a director of Rocky Horror Company Limited.

Reception 
Panter and Squire have received a number of joint awards and recognitions:
 2008 Ernst & Young "Entrepreneur of the Year": regional finalist
 2010 Evening Standard Awards, "London's 1000 Most Influential People: Theatre": first place
 2012 Manchester Evening News Awards, "250 of the most influential people in Greater Manchester"
 2010–2016, The Stage "Top 100 People In British Theatre": first place
 2019 Honorary Freedom of the Borough of Woking.

Panter received a knighthood in 2013 Queen's Birthday Honours for "services to theatre".

Personal life

Panter met Rosemary Squire at the Queen's Theatre in London, where both were working during his production of  And a Nightingale Sang with Patricia Routledge. Simon Callow was his best man at their wedding.

References

Living people
Knights Bachelor
British theatre managers and producers
People educated at Clayesmore School
Year of birth missing (living people)